Return to Earth is an American biopic television film that originally aired on May 14, 1976 on ABC. The film stars  Cliff Robertson as astronaut Buzz Aldrin and Shirley Knight as Joan Aldrin. Based upon Aldrin's 1973 book of the same name, the film dramatizes the emotional difficulties of Aldrin's life following his 1969 trip to the Moon on Apollo 11. The film was directed by Jud Taylor, and Aldrin served as a consultant.

Plot
Based upon his own book of his ordeals, the film is the story of Buzz Aldrin, the second man to walk on the Moon, and the problems he had after the mission and his return to Earth, including the breakup of his marriage, his struggles with clinical depression and alcoholism, and his hospitalization for psychiatric problems.

Cast 
 Cliff Robertson as Col. Edwin E. 'Buzz' Aldrin Jr.
 Shirley Knight as Joan Aldrin
 Charles Cioffi as Dr. Sam Mayhill
 Ralph Bellamy as Col. Edwin E. Aldrin
 Stefanie Powers as Marianne
 Kraig Metzinger as Andy Aldrin
 Alexandra Taylor as Jan Aldrin
 Tony Marks as Mike Aldrin
 Stephen Pearlman as Dr. Hotfield
 Stefan Gierasch as Al Davis
 Mark Roberts		
 Lance Henriksen
 Conard Fowkes
 George D. Wallace
 Robert Karnes
 Davis Roberts
 Robert Williams
 Shelley Mitchell

Production
Robertson's casting was announced in September 1975.

Reception
The Los Angeles Times called it "decent, well acted, uninspired."

References

External links
 

Films directed by Jud Taylor
Biographical television films
ABC network original films
American television films
American biographical films
1970s biographical films
1976 television films
1976 films
Films about astronauts
Cultural depictions of Buzz Aldrin
Films scored by Billy Goldenberg
Films based on biographies
1970s American films